Amadeo Bordiga (13 June 1889 – 25 July 1970) was an Italian Marxist theorist, revolutionary socialist, founder of the Communist Party of Italy (PCI), member of the Communist International (Comintern) and later a leading figure of the International Communist Party. Bordiga was originally associated with the PCI, but he was expelled in 1930 after being accused of Trotskyism.

Bordiga is viewed as one of the most notable representatives of Left communism in Europe.

Biography

Family and early life 
Bordiga was born at Resina in the province of Naples in 1889. His father, Oreste Bordiga, was an esteemed scholar of agricultural science, whose authority was especially recognized in regard to the centuries-old agricultural problems of Southern Italy. His mother, Zaira degli Amadei, was descended from an ancient Florentine family and his maternal grandfather Count Michele Amadei was a conspirator in the struggles of the Risorgimento. His paternal uncle, Giovanni Bordiga, another militant of the Risorgimento, was a mathematician and professor at the University of Padua. Bordiga's upbringing, while being thoroughly radical, was also of a highly scientific nature.

An opponent of the Italian colonial war in Libya, Bordiga was introduced to the Italian Socialist Party (PSI) by his high-school physics teacher in 1910. Bordiga eventually founded the Karl Marx Circle in 1912, where he would meet his first wife, Ortensia De Meo.

Bordiga graduated with a degree in engineering from University of Naples Federico II in 1912.

Personal life 
Bordiga married Ortensia De Meo in 1914. They had two children, Alma and Oreste. Ortensia died in 1955, and Bordiga married Ortensia's sister, Antonietta De Meo ten years later in 1965.

Political career

Italian Socialist Party 
Within the newly founded Karl Marx Circle, Bordiga rejected a pedagogical approach to political work and developed a "theory of the Party", whereby the organization was meant to display non-immediate goals as a rally of similarly minded people and not necessarily a body of the working class. However, Bordiga was deeply opposed to representative democracy which he associated with bourgeois electoralism:
Thus if there is a complete negation of the theory of democratic action it is to be found in socialism (Il Socialista, 1914).

Therefore, Bordiga opposed the parliamentary faction of the PSI being autonomous from central control.

In common with most socialists in Latin countries, Bordiga campaigned against Freemasonry which he identified as a non-secular group.

Communist Party of Italy 

Following the October Revolution, Bordiga rallied to the communist movement and formed the communist abstentionist faction within the PSI, abstentionist in that it opposed participation in bourgeois elections. The group would form with the addition of the former L'Ordine Nuovo grouping in Turin around Antonio Gramsci the backbone of the Communist Party of Italy (PCd'I), founded at Livorno in January 1921. This came after a long internal struggle in the PSI as it had voted as early as 1919 to affiliate to the Comintern, but it had refused to purge its reformist wing. In the course of the conflict, Bordiga attended the 2nd Comintern Congress in 1920, where he added two points to the Twenty-one Conditions of membership proposed by Vladimir Lenin. Nevertheless, he was criticised by Lenin in his work "Left-Wing" Communism: An Infantile Disorder (1920) over a disagreement regarding parliamentary abstentionism.

For Bordiga, the party was the social brain of the proletariat whose task was not to seek majority support, but to concentrate on working for an armed insurrection in the course of which it would seize power and then use it to abolish capitalism and impose a communist society by force. Bordiga identified with the dictatorship of the proletariat and the dictatorship of the party and argued that establishing its own dictatorship should be the party's immediate and direct aim. This position was accepted by the majority of the members of the PCd'I, but it was to bring them into conflict with the Comintern when in 1921 the latter adopted a new tactic, i.e. that of the united front with reformist organisations to fight for reforms and even to form a workers' government. Bordiga regarded this as a reversion to the failed tactics which the pre-war social democrats had adopted and which had led to them becoming reformist.

Out of a regard for discipline, Bordiga and his comrades (who became known as the Italian communist left) accepted the Comintern decision, but they were in an increasingly difficult position. When Bordiga was arrested in February 1923 on a trumped-up charge by the new government of Benito Mussolini, he had to give up his post as member of the Central Committee of the PCd'I. On his acquittal later that year, Bordiga decided not to reclaim it, therefore implicitly accepting that he was now an oppositionist. In 1924, the Italian communist left lost control of the PCd'I to a pro-Moscow group whose leader Gramsci became the party's General Secretary in June. At the Third Congress of the PCd'I held in exile in Lyons in January 1926, the manoeuvre of the pro-Moscow group was completed. Without the support of the Communist International to escape from Fascist control, few members of the Italian Communist Left were able to arrive to the Congress, so the theses drawn up by Bordiga were rejected and those of the Stalinist minority group accepted.

Under arrest 
In December 1926, Bordiga was again arrested by Mussolini and sent to prison in Ustica, an Italian island in the Tyrrhenian Sea, where he met with Gramsci and they renewed their friendship and worked alongside each other despite their political differences. Bordiga was concerned about Gramsci's ill health, but nothing came of a plan to help him escape the island. In 1928, Bordiga was moved to the Isle of Ponza, where he built several houses, returning after his detention in 1929 to finish them.

Opposition 
Following his release, Bordiga did not resume his activities in the PCd'I and was in fact expelled in March 1930, accused of having "supported, defended and endorsed the positions of the Trotskyist opposition" and been organisationally disruptive. With his expulsion, Bordiga left political activity until 1943 and he was to refuse to comment on political affairs even when asked by trusted friends. However, many of his former supporters in the PCd'I went into exile and founded a political tendency often referred to as Italian communist left.

In 1928, its members in exile in France and Belgium formed themselves into the Left Fraction of the Communist Party of Italy which became in 1935 the Italian Fraction of the Communist Left. This change of name was a reflection of the Italian Communist Left's view that the PCd'I and the other communist parties had now become counter-revolutionary. The Bordigists, as they became known, with their theory of the party and their opposition to any form of frontism, held that program was everything and a gate-receipt notion of numbers was nothing. Bordiga would again work with many of these comrades following the end of World War II.

International Communist Party 
After 1944, he first returned to political activity in the Naples-based Fraction of Socialists and Communists, but when this grouping was dissolved into the Internationalist Communist Party (PCInt) Bordiga did not initially join. However, he did contribute anonymously to its press, primarily Battaglia Comunista and Prometeo, in keeping with his conviction that revolutionary work was collective in nature and his opposition to any form of (even incipient) personality cult. Bordiga joined the PCInt in 1949.

When the current split in two in 1951, he took the side of the grouping that took on the name International Communist Party, publishing its Il Programma Comunista. Bordiga devoted himself to the party, contributing extensively. Bordiga remained with the ICP until his death at Formia in 1970.

Theories and beliefs 
Bordigism is a variant of left communism espoused by Bordiga. Bordigists in the Italian Socialist Party would be the first to refuse on principle any participation in parliamentary elections.

On Marxism–Leninism 
On the theoretical level, Bordiga developed an understanding of the Soviet Union as a capitalist society. Bordiga's writings on the capitalist nature of the Soviet economy in contrast to those produced by the Trotskyists also focused on the agrarian sector. In analyzing the agriculture in the Soviet Union, Bordiga sought to display the capitalist social relations that existed in the kolkhoz and sovkhoz, one a cooperative farm and the other a wage-labor state farm. In particular, he emphasized how much of the national agrarian produce came from small privately owned plots (writing in 1950) and predicted the rates at which the Soviet Union would start importing wheat after Imperial Russia had been such a large exporter from the 1880s to 1914.

In Bordiga's conception of Marxism–Leninism; Joseph Stalin, and later Mao Zedong, Ho Chi Minh, and so on were great Romantic revolutionaries, i.e. bourgeois revolutionaries. He felt that the Marxist–Leninist states that came into existence after 1945 were extending the bourgeois nature of prior revolutions that degenerated as all had in common a policy of expropriation and agrarian and productive development which he considered negations of previous conditions and not the genuine construction of socialism.

On democracy 
Bordiga defined himself as anti-democratic, believing himself to be following the tradition of Karl Marx and Friedrich Engels. However, Bordiga's hostility toward democracy was unrelated to the Stalinist narrative of the single-party state, as he saw fascism and Stalinism as the culmination of bourgeois democracy. To Bordiga, democracy meant above all the manipulation of society as a formless mass. To this, he counterposed the dictatorship of the proletariat, to be implemented by the communist party based on the principles and program enunciated in The Communist Manifesto (1848). He often referred to the spirit of Engels' remark that "on the eve of the revolution all the forces of reaction will be against us under the banner of 'pure democracy'" (as every factional opponent of the Bolsheviks in 1921 from the monarchists to the anarchists called for soviets without Bolsheviks—or soviet workers councils not dominated by Bolsheviks).

As such, Bordiga opposed the idea of revolutionary theory being the product of a democratic process of pluralist views, believing that the Marxist perspective has the merit of underscoring the fact that like all social formations, communism is above all about the expression of programmatic content. This enforces the fact that, for Marxists, communism is not an ideal to be achieved, but a real movement born from the old society with a set of programmatic tasks.

On the united front 
Bordiga resolutely opposed the Comintern's turn to the right in 1921. As leader of the Communist Party of Italy, he refused to implement the united front strategy of the Third Congress. He also refused to fuse the newly formed party, dominated by Bordigism, with the left-wing of the Italian Socialist Party from which it had just broken away. Bordiga had a completely different view of the party from the Comintern which was adapting to the revolutionary ebb that was announced in 1921 by the Anglo-Russian trade agreement, the Kronstadt rebellion, the implementation of the New Economic Policy, the banning of factions and the defeat of the March Action in Germany.

For Bordiga, the Western European communist parties' strategy of fighting this ebb by absorbing a mass of left-wing social democrats through the united front was a complete capitulation to the period of counter-revolutionary ebb he saw setting in. This was the base of his critique of democracy, for it was in the name of conquering the masses that the Comintern seemed to be making all kinds of programmatic concessions to left-wing social democrats. For Bordiga, program was everything, a gate-receipt notion of numbers was nothing. The role of the party in the period of ebb was to preserve the program and to carry on the propaganda work possible until the next turn of the tide, not to dilute it while chasing ephemeral popularity.

Bordiga's analysis provided a way of seeing a fundamental degeneration in the world communist movement in 1921 (instead of in 1927 with the defeat of Trotsky) without simply calling for more democracy. The abstract formal perspective of bureaucracy/democracy, with which the Trotskyist tradition treats this crucial period in Comintern history, became separated from any content. Bordiga throughout his life called himself a Leninist and never polemicized against Lenin directly, but his totally different appreciation of the 1921 conjuncture, its consequences for the Comintern and his opposition to Lenin and Trotsky on the united front issue illuminates a turning point that is generally obscured by the heirs of the Trotskyist wing of the international left opposition of the 1920s.

On communism 
Although most Leninists distinguish between socialism and communism and Bordiga did consider himself a Leninist, being described as "more Leninist than Lenin", he did not distinguish between the two in the same way Leninists do. Bordiga did not see socialism as a separate mode of production from communism, but rather just as how communism looks as it emerges from capitalism before it has "developed on its own foundations". Bordiga used the term socialism to mean what Marx called the lower-phase communism. Sticking to Marx's concept of communism, for Bordiga, both stages of socialist or communist society—with stages referring to historical materialism—were characterised by the absence of money, capital, the market and so on, the difference between them being that earlier in the first stage rationing would be done in a way in which "a given amount of labor in one form is exchanged for an equal amount of labor in another form", with deductions being made from said labor to fund public projects, and difference in interests between the rural and urban proletariat would exist, whilst in communism "bourgeoisie law" would be no more, hence the equal standard applied to all peoples no longer would apply, and the alienated man "will not aim to win back his person", but rather become a new "Social Man". Arguing against what Bordiga saw as the "bourgeois" idea of "free producer economies", he instead declares that under communism (whether it be the lower stage or higher stage), production and consumption are both enslaved to society.

This view distinguished Bordiga from other Leninists and especially the Trotskyists, who tended and still tend to telescope the first two stages and so have money and the other exchange categories surviving into socialism, but Bordiga would have none of this. For him, no society in which money, buying and selling and the rest survived could be regarded as either socialist or communist—these exchange categories would die out before the socialist rather than the communist stage was reached.

Legacy

Influences 
Jacques Camatte began corresponding with Bordiga from the age of 19 in 1954, and Bordiga developed a long-standing relationship with Camatte and ideological influence over him. Camatte's early work very much reads in line with the Bordigist current, and Bordiga frequently contributed to Camatte's journal Invariance near the end of his life. Even after Camatte's break with Marxism following Bordiga's death, Camatte's preoccupation within the subject of 'Gemeinwesen' (community, commonwealth) within Marx's work is consistent with Bordiga's emphasis on the anti-individualist and collectivist aspects of Marxism.

Bordiga also influenced Gilles Dauvé, and had great influence over the Ultra-leftist currents of the twentieth and twenty-first centuries.

General Legacy 
The Amadeo Bordiga Foundation was established in 1998 in Formia, in the house where Bordiga spent the last several months of his life. The foundation organizes publications of Bordiga's works and encourages further expansions upon his ideas.

In August 2020, Historical Materialism published The Science and Passion of Communism, an anthology of English translations of Bordiga's work.

See also 
 International Communist Party
 Left-communism
 Leninism

References

Bibliography

External links 

 The International Library of the Communist Left - Bordiga Page.
 Bordiga Archive at Marxists.org.
 Archives of "Sinistra comunista 'italiana'" - Hundreds texts of Bordiga at "n+1" Review.
 Libertarian Communist Library Amadeo Bordiga archive.
 Antagonism Bordiga Archive (Archived 25 October 2009).
 Bordigism - Adam Buick  (Archived 25 October 2009).
 Loren Goldner, Communism is the Material Human Community: Amadeo Bordiga Today.
 International Communist Party.
 Earlene Craver The Third Generation: The Young Socialists in Italy, 1907-1915.
 Philippe Bourrinet, The "Bordigist" Current, (1912-1952) at "Left Wing" Communism - an infantile disorder?.
 https://www.marxists.org/archive/bordiga/works/1960/immutable-tablets.htm
 https://www.marxists.org/archive/marx/works/1875/gotha/ch01.htm
 https://www.marxists.org/archive/bordiga/works/1957/fundamentals.htm

 
1889 births
1970 deaths
People from the Province of Naples
People from Formia
Executive Committee of the Communist International
Italian anti-capitalists
Italian atheists
Italian socialists
Italian Marxists
Italian male journalists
Marxist theorists
Italian Communist Party politicians
20th-century Italian politicians
Italian Socialist Party politicians
Left communists
Anti-Masonry
Anti-Stalinist left
20th-century Italian journalists
20th-century Italian engineers